A gallipot is a small jar, traditionally of glazed earthenware, used by apothecaries for holding ointment or medicine. In the 21st century gallipots are available in plastic: a sales catalogue describes one with a 60ml capacity as "For general use, surgical procedures, and other medical uses; Useful for holding medicines or ointments".  Another supplier offers both single-use and reusable gallipots of 60ml and 280ml.

The term, recorded from the 15th century, may derive from the idea of pots originally imported in galleys, and has also been used for small pots used for other purposes - such as preparing an individual portion of custard or melting wax while making  fishing flies.

The 16th-century Gallipot Inn in Hartfield, Sussex, England, is said to take its name "from the small glazed earthenware pots made to contain medicines and ointments that were once produced on-site".

Gallipots in a variety of shapes are held in several museums.

References

Surgical instruments
Containers